Keetmanshoop Rural is an electoral constituency in the ǁKaras Region of Namibia. It contains the Krönlein suburb of Keetmanshoop and the villages of Koës and Aroab, the settlements of Seeheim and Klein Karas, as well as several farming communities in the area. The constituency office is situated in Aroab. It had a populations of 7,219 in 2011, up from 6,399 in 2001.  the constituency had 6,398 registered voters.

Politics
In the 2004 regional elections, Aroab schoolteacher Willem Appollus of SWAPO won the constituency. He was subsequently elected by the ǁKaras Regional council to represent the Region in the National Council. Apollus did not seek re-election in 2010. In the 2010 regional elections, SWAPO's Jims Christiaan won the constituency with 736 votes. He defeated challengers was Simon Johannes Jantze of Rally for Democracy and Progress (RDP, 648 votes), Bartholomeus Rooi of  Democratic Turnhalle Alliance (DTA, 433 votes) and Joseph Isaaks of the Congress of Democrats (CoD, 88 votes).

In the 2015 regional elections, Elias Kharuxab of SWAPO won the constituency with 1,288 votes. He defeated challengers Moses Timotheus Titus (DTA, 474 votes) and Willem Martin Stephanus (RDP, 269 votes). The 2020 regional election was Gerrit Witbooi from the Landless People's Movement (LPM, a new party registered in 2018). He obtained 1,817 votes. Kharuxab, the sitting SWAPO councillor, came second with 919 votes.

References

Constituencies of ǁKaras Region
Keetmanshoop
States and territories established in 1992
1992 establishments in Namibia